Turki Sufyani (Arabic: تركي سفياني) is a football player who plays as a forward for Al-Ain in Saudi Arabia.

References

1992 births
Living people
Sportspeople from Riyadh
Saudi Arabian footballers
Al Nassr FC players
Al-Orobah FC players
Ettifaq FC players
Al-Nahda Club (Saudi Arabia) players
Al-Washm Club players
Al-Qadsiah FC players
Al-Thoqbah Club players
Khaleej FC players
Al-Sahel SC (Saudi Arabia) players
Al-Riyadh SC players
Al-Ain FC (Saudi Arabia) players
Saudi Professional League players
Saudi First Division League players
Saudi Second Division players
Association football forwards